The biopsychiatry controversy is a dispute over which viewpoint should predominate and form a basis of psychiatric theory and practice. The debate is a criticism of a claimed strict biological view of psychiatric thinking. Its critics include disparate groups such as the antipsychiatry movement and some academics.

Overview of opposition to biopsychiatry
Biological psychiatry or biopsychiatry aims to investigate determinants of mental disorders devising remedial measures of a primarily somatic nature.

This has been criticized by Alvin Pam for being a "stilted, unidimensional, and mechanistic world-view", so that subsequent "research in psychiatry has been geared toward discovering which aberrant genetic or neurophysiological factors underlie and cause social deviance". According to Pam the "blame the body" approach, which typically offers medication for mental distress, shifts the focus from disturbed behavior in the family to putative biochemical imbalances.

Research issues

2003 status in biopsychiatric research 
Biopsychiatric research has produced reproducible abnormalities of brain structure and function, and a strong genetic component for a number of psychiatric disorders (although the latter has never been shown to be causative, merely correlative). It has also elucidated some of the mechanisms of action of medications that are effective in treating some of these disorders. Still, by their own admission, this research has not progressed to the stage that they can identify clear biomarkers of these disorders.

Focus on genetic factors
Researchers have proposed that most common psychiatric and drug abuse disorders can be traced to a small number of dimensions of genetic risk and reports show significant associations between specific genomic regions and psychiatric disorders. Though, to date only a few genetic lesions have been demonstrated to be mechanistically responsible for psychiatric conditions. For example, one reported finding suggests that in persons diagnosed with schizophrenia as well as in their relatives with chronic psychiatric illnesses, the gene that encodes phosphodiesterase 4B (PDE4B) is disrupted by a balanced translocation.

The reasons for the relative lack of genetic understanding is because the links between genes and mental states defined as abnormal appear highly complex, involve extensive environmental influences and can be mediated in numerous different ways, for example by personality, temperament or life events. Therefore, while twin studies and other research suggests that personality is heritable to some extent, finding the genetic basis for particular personality or temperament traits, and their links to mental health problems, is "at least as hard as the search for genes involved in other complex disorders." Theodore Lidz and The Gene Illusion. argue that biopsychiatrists use genetic terminology in an unscientific way to reinforce their approach. Joseph maintains that biopsychiatrists disproportionately focus on understanding the genetics of those individuals with mental health problems at the expense of addressing the problems of the living in the environments of some extremely abusive families or societies.

Focus on biochemical factors 

The chemical imbalance hypothesis states that a chemical imbalance within the brain is the main cause of psychiatric conditions and that these conditions can be improved with medication which corrects this imbalance. In that, emotions within a "normal" spectrum reflect a proper balance of neurotransmitter function, but abnormally extreme emotions which are severe enough to impact the daily functioning of patients (as seen in schizophrenia) reflect a profound imbalance. It is the goal of psychiatric intervention, therefore, to regain the homeostasis (via psychopharmacological approaches) that existed prior to the onset of disease.

This conceptual framework has been debated within the scientific community, although no other demonstrably superior hypothesis has emerged. Recently, the biopsychosocial approach to mental illness has been shown to be the most comprehensive and applicable theory in understanding psychiatric disorders. However, there is still much to be discovered in this area of inquiry. As a prime example - while great strides have been made in the field of understanding certain psychiatric disorders (such as schizophrenia) others (such as major depressive disorder) operate via multiple different neurotransmitters and interact in a complex array of systems which are (as yet) not completely understood.

Reductionism
Niall McLaren emphasizes in his books Humanizing Madness and Humanizing Psychiatry that the major problem with psychiatry is that it lacks a unified model of the mind and has become entrapped in a biological reductionist paradigm. The reasons for this biological shift are intuitive as reductionism has been very effective in other fields of science and medicine. However, despite reductionism's efficacy  in explaining the smallest parts of the brain this does not explain the mind, which is where he contends the majority of psychopathology stems from. An example would be that every aspect of a computer can be understood scientifically down to the last atom; however, this does not reveal the program that drives this hardware. He also argues that the widespread acceptance of the reductionist paradigm leads to a lack of openness to self-criticism and therefore halts the very engine of scientific progress. He has proposed his own natural dualist model of the mind, the biocognitive model, which is rooted in the theories of David Chalmers and Alan Turing and does not fall into the dualist's trap of spiritualism.

Economic influences on psychiatric practice

American Psychiatric Association president Steven S. Sharfstein, M.D. has stated that when the profit motive of pharmaceutical companies and human good are aligned,  the results are mutually beneficial for all.  In that, "Pharmaceutical companies have developed and brought to market medications that have transformed the lives of millions of psychiatric patients.  The proven effectiveness of antidepressant, mood-stabilizing, and antipsychotic medications has helped sensitize the public to the reality of mental illness and taught them that treatment works. In this way, Big Pharma has helped reduce stigma associated with psychiatric treatment and with psychiatrists." However, Sharfstein acknowledged that the goals of individual physicians who deliver direct patient care can be different from the pharmaceutical and medical device industry.  Conflicts arising from this disparity raise natural concerns in this regard including:

a "broken health care system" that allows "many patients [to be] prescribed the wrong drugs or drugs they don't need";
"medical education opportunities sponsored by pharmaceutical companies [that] are often biased toward one product or another";
"[d]irect marketing to consumers [that] also leads to increased demand for medications and inflates expectations about the benefits of medications";
"drug companies [paying] physicians to allow company reps to sit in on patient sessions to learn more about care for patients."

Nevertheless, Sharfstein acknowledged that without pharmaceutical companies developing and producing modern medicines - virtually every medical specialty would have few (if any) treatments for the patients that they care for.

Pharmaceutical industry influences in psychiatry
Studies have shown that promotional marketing by pharmaceutical and other companies has the potential to influence physician decision making.  Pharmaceutical manufacturers (and other advocates) would argue that in today's modern world - physicians simply do not have the time to continually update their knowledge base on the status of the latest research and that by providing educational materials for both physicians and patients, they are providing an educational perspective and that it is up to the individual physician to decide what treatment is best for their patients.  The idea of pure promotion (e.g., lavish dinners) is a remnant of bygone era.  It has been replaced by educationally-based activities that became the basis for the legal and industry reforms involving physician gifts, influence in graduate medical education, physician disclosure of conflicts of interest, and other promotional activities.

In an essay on the effect of advertisements for marketed anti-depressants there is some evidence that both patients and physicians can be influenced by media advertisements and this has the possibility of increasing the frequency of certain medicines being prescribed over others.

See also

General 
Anti-psychiatry – A movement critiquing psychiatry from the human rights perspective.
Bipolar disorders research – biopsychiatric analysis into the cause of bipolar disorders.
Elliott Valenstein – a psychologist and neuroscientist, author of Blaming the Brain.
The Gene Illusion – a book by clinical psychologist Jay Joseph.
Causes of schizophrenia
Controversy about ADHD
A Brief History of Anxiety (Yours & Mine), a book by journalist Patricia Pearson
Trauma model of mental disorders
Interpretation of Schizophrenia – Award-winning book by Silvano Arieti, which sets forth demonstrative evidence of a psychological etiology for schizophrenia.

Groups critical of the biomedical paradigm
Mindfreedom – A group which advocates "choice" regarding psychopharmaceuticals.
ICSPP (International Center for the Study of Psychiatry and Psychology)
ISPS (International Society for Psychological and Social Approaches to Psychoses)
CEP (Council for Evidence-based Psychiatry)

External links

Criticisms from psychologists and the medical profession 
APA Fights Attempt to Limit Access to Psychoactive Drugs, American Psychiatric Association president Michelle Riba, M.D., M.S.
Against Biologic Psychiatry - an article by David Kaiser, M.D., in Psychiatric Times (1996, Vol. XIII, Issue 12).
Challenging the Therapeutic State – special issue of The Journal of Mind and Behavior (1990, Vol.11:3).
Letter of Resignation from the American Psychiatric Association – from Loren R. Mosher, M.D., former Chief of Schizophrenia Studies at the National Institute of Mental Health.
Memorandum from the Critical Psychiatry Network to the United Kingdom Parliament – Written evidence to the House of Commons Select Committee on Health, April 2005.

Methodological issues
On the Limits of Localization of Cognitive Processes in the Brain – an essay by William R. Uttal, Professor Emeritus of Psychology at the University of Michigan, based on his book The New Phrenology (MIT Press, 2001).

References 

Psychiatry controversies
Anti-psychiatry
Medical controversies
Biological psychiatry